When the Dead Start Singing is a Croatian feature film directed by Krsto Papić. It was released in 1998.

Cast
Ivo Gregurević – Cinco Kapulica
Ivica Vidović – Marinko
Mirjana Majurec – Maca Kapulica
Ksenija Pajić – Stana
Matija Prskalo – Cinco's daughter
Boris Miholjević – Dr. Lučić
 - Vlajko
Dražen Kühn - Ante

References

External links
 

1998 films
1990s Croatian-language films
Films directed by Krsto Papić
Jadran Film films
Croatian comedy films
Croatian films based on plays
1998 comedy films